Grace Church (also known as York-Hampton Parish Church) is a historic Episcopal church and cemetery at Route 1003 and Main Street in Yorktown, Virginia.

It was built in 1697 and later updated with a Greek Revival style. Thomas Nelson, Jr., a signer of the Declaration of Independence and other pre-Revolution Founding Fathers attended the church.

The building was added to the National Register of Historic Places in 1970.

See also
 List of the oldest buildings in Virginia

References

External links
 Grace Church Official Website
 

Episcopal churches in Virginia
Churches completed in 1697
Churches in York County, Virginia
Cemeteries in York County, Virginia
Churches on the National Register of Historic Places in Virginia
National Register of Historic Places in York County, Virginia
17th-century Episcopal church buildings
1697 establishments in Virginia